Merhamet (English: Compassion) is a Turkish drama television series, adapted from Hande Altaylı's novel Kahperengi. It stars Özgü Namal and İbrahim Çelikkol. Set in 1996, it tells the story of Narin, who is a lawyer in Istanbul.

Plot summary
Narin is a girl from a poor family with an abusive alcoholic father. Struggling against family pressure to quit school, she escapes to the big city. Through dedicated study she becomes a successful lawyer. She makes friends with a rich girl, Deniz, but faces difficulties when Firat, her first love, reappears in her life, engaged to Deniz's sister.

Cast
Özgü Namal as Narin Yilmaz
İbrahim Çelikkol as Fırat Kazan
Burçin Terzioğlu as Deniz
Mustafa Üstündağ as Sermet Karayel
Yasemin Allen as Irmak
Ahmet Rifat Şungar as Atif
Turgut Tunçalp
Ayşegül Cengiz Akman
Kosta Cortis
Gonca Cilasun

Broadcast schedule

International publication

Representation in other countries

External links

References

2013 Turkish television series debuts
2014 Turkish television series endings
Turkish drama television series
Television shows based on novels
Kanal D original programming
Television series produced in Istanbul
Television shows set in Istanbul